Carex cercidascus is a tussock-forming perennial sedge in the family Cyperaceae. It is native to eastern parts of southeastern China.

See also
List of Carex species

References

cercidascus
Endemic flora of China
Flora of Southeast China
Plants described in 1903
Taxa named by Charles Baron Clarke